Bob Goode (born 28 October 1943) is a former  Australian rules footballer who played with North Melbourne in the Victorian Football League (VFL).

Notes

External links 

Living people
1943 births
Australian rules footballers from Victoria (Australia)
North Melbourne Football Club players
Yarrawonga Football Club players